"It Ain't Safe" is a song performed by British rapper Skepta, featuring a hook from Young Lord (also known as ASAP Bari). It was released in the form of a promotional video on 2 November 2014, and features on Skepta's fourth album Konnichiwa (2016). Despite being unavailable to buy until the release of the album, the song peaked at number 32 on the UK R&B Singles Chart due to strong streaming performance.

Music video
A music video to accompany the release of "It Ain't Safe" was first released onto YouTube on 31 October 2014 at a total length of four minutes and seventeen seconds.

Chart performance

Weekly charts

Certifications

Release history

References

2014 songs
2014 singles
Skepta songs
Songs written by Skepta